Snježana Mijić (born  in Ogulin) is a former Croatian volleyball player. She was part of the Croatia women's national volleyball team at the 1998 FIVB Volleyball Women's World Championship in Japan. During her career she mostly played for HAOK Mladost Zagreb.

Mijić graduated from the law school. After finishing the playing career, she became a sports functionary, and in 2002 she held the role of sports director of all national volleyball teams, and a vice president of the European Volleyball Confederation.

References

1971 births
Living people
Croatian women's volleyball players
People from Ogulin
Sport in Karlovac County